Philipp Marx and Alexander Peya were the defending champions, but Peya didn't start this year.
Marx partnered up with Denis Gremelmayr. However, they lost to Rubén Ramírez Hidalgo and Santiago Ventura in the semifinal. This pair won all matches and became the new champions, after won against Simon Greul and Alessandro Motti in the final.

Seeds

Draw

Draw

References
 Doubles Draw

Schickedanz Open - Doubles
2009 Doubles